Diane St. Onge (born June 21, 1956) is an American politician and a former Republican member of the Kentucky House of Representatives representing District 63. She served from 2013 to 2019.

Education
St. Onge earned her Bachelor of Arts from the Northern Kentucky University, graduated from Santa Clara University, and earned her Juris Doctor from Northern Kentucky University.

Elections
2012 When District 63 Representative Alecia Webb-Edgington ran for United States House of Representatives for Kentucky's 4th congressional district and left the seat open, St. Onge won the May 22, 2012 Republican Primary with 3,366 votes (76.7%) and was unopposed for the November 6, 2012 General election, winning with 16,812 votes.

Committees
St. Onge chaired the Small Business & Information Technology Committee, and served on the Kentucky House Economic Investment & Workforce Investment Committee and the Licensing, Occupations, & Administrative Regulations Committee.

References

External links
Official page at the Kentucky General Assembly
Campaign site

Diane St. Onge at Ballotpedia
Diane St. Onge at the National Institute on Money in State Politics

Place of birth missing (living people)
1956 births
Living people
Kentucky lawyers
Republican Party members of the Kentucky House of Representatives
Northern Kentucky University alumni
People from Kenton County, Kentucky
Salmon P. Chase College of Law alumni
Santa Clara University alumni
Women state legislators in Kentucky
21st-century American politicians
21st-century American women politicians